Horary astrology is an ancient branch of horoscopic astrology in which an astrologer attempts to answer a question by constructing a horoscope for the exact time at which the question was received and understood by the astrologer. 

The answer to the horary question might be a simple yes or no, but is generally more complex with insights into, for example, the motives of the questioners, the motives of others involved in the matter, and the options available to them.

Approach
Horary as a system of divination relies on principles and applications of astrological principles sometimes unique to the branch, though coherent in approach with broader astrological claims. The position of and aspects to the moon are of prime importance. The person asking the question, or "querent," is represented by the ruler of the sign the first house cusp falls on in the horoscope. Planetary aspects to the house cusps are considered more important than in other branches of astrology (although it is the planetary rulers of the houses in question that take precedence in analysis). Other key elements used in horary astrology include the lunar nodes, the planetary antiscia, the fixed stars and the Arabic parts.

Typically, a horary chart is read by first assigning the thing asked about, the "quesited," to a particular house in the chart. For instance, asking "Where is my lost dog?" would be represented by the sixth house, as it is the house that governs small animals (traditionally, smaller than a goat). The house cusp of the sixth house will be in a particular sign, for example Libra. Libra is ruled by Venus, so Venus is considered the "significator" of the lost dog. Venus's state in the horoscope will give clues to the animal's wellbeing, and its placement will give indications related to its location.

Assigning houses
Any house system preferred by the astrologer may be used, but commonly horary astrologers choose to divide the chart using the Regiomontanus house system as a space-based, quadrant system.

Understanding the correct house for the context of the question is pivotal to the correct interpretation of a horary question. Everything can be assigned to a house and it is to that house, and its ruler, that the assignation of the quesited is derived. Whatever planet is ruling the sign on the cusp of the house is taken to signify the quesited. The context of the horary will often determine the house. For example, if the horary is about matters pertaining to career, the ruler of the 10th House, natural house for careers and jobs, will be indicate the quesited. 

A short, non-exhaustive, list of possible associations with houses follows:

The First House
The querent (person asking the question). The querent's physical appearance (hair color and body type for example) or temperament, so mental state. 

The Second House
The querent's finance, wealth and general material and financial possessions. Moveable possessions as opposed to immovable possessions. Allies or supports for the querent, such as your lawyer in court cases. Any personal (moveable) goods and belongings, immovable possessions such as houses are fourth house. Questions about the value of any of your possessions.

The Third House
Siblings and neighbors. Any general concern about relatives may be considered third house. Communications and contracts. General comings and goings and short journeys and travels. Letters, emails and paperwork. (Cars may be second or third depending on the context of the question- in matters of travel, the third may be used, in matters pertaining to the value of the car, or of buying or selling a car, then the second may be used.) Lower education such as elementary, junior high/middle and high school.

The Fourth House
Parents. Immovable possessions as opposed to movable possessions, e.g. your houses, garden, orchard. Mines, oil, buried treasure and anything which comes from the 'bowels of the earth'.

The Fifth House
Children, love affairs, romance, sex (pleasure and procreation). Gambling, speculation, arguments, games and pleasure. Any venue that caters to our pleasures or provide entertainment including restaurants, clubs, bars and music venues, basically any place you go and have fun.

The Sixth House
Illness and disease or sickness. Also servants, or anyone who works for you, such as a plumber, electrician or anyone in your employ. Pets and small animals, traditionally considered smaller than a goat (larger animals are twelfth house). Work & work environment. People with whom you work together in some kind of agreement. 

The Seventh House
Marriage, partners and partnerships - both business and personal. Competitors and opponents of all kinds. It is the house of open enemies, by which it is meant enemies that you are aware of. Hidden enemies are the twelfth house. If no other house suffices, use the seventh house to represent 'any old person'.

The Eighth House
Death, fears, anxiety. It is also commonly used to "the house of other people's money" . (see 'Turning the chart' below).

The Ninth House
Long distance travel, or, travel to unknown or 'exotic' locations. Foreigners and foreign lands. Universities and students of any subject of higher education such as doctors, lawyers, priests and astrologers. Visions, dreams and religion, as well as churches and philosophies. Books. Pilgrimages or journeys for spiritual or religious reasons.

The Tenth House
Career and persons of authority. Heads of state, the government generally, judges and royalty. It is also commonly used to indicate the property belonging to the partner or opponent (see 'Turning the chart' below).

The Eleventh House
Friendships or groups. Wishes, hopes and aspirations. It is considered the house of 'Good Fortune'. Most people know this as the house of friends and acquaintances. (see 'Turning the chart' below).

The Twelfth House
Secrets, hidden motives and enemies, captivity, imprisonment and self-undoing. Things not yet known to the querent. Any form of non-voluntary bondage or captivity, monasteries, being voluntary and religious are ninth house. Magick, Witchcraft or any manner of secretly undermining the querent.

Turning the chart
In addition, houses may gain extra meaning by way of 'turning the chart'. If you know that the fourth house relates to the father, and that the third house relates to siblings, you can turn the chart to get the father's sibling by taking the third house (siblings) from the fourth house (father), in other words, by counting three houses from the fourth. In this manner the sixth house (third from the fourth), in addition to its natural meaning, may also be used for any brothers and sisters of the father. In a horary question about, for example, your aunt or uncle, it would make sense to turn the chart and use the sixth house if it is your father's brother or sister, or, alternatively, to use the twelfth house (third from tenth) if it is your mother's brother or sister. Turned houses are called derived houses, as opposed to the normal radical houses. If you doubt whether the fourth or the tenth house represents the father, you can ask a horary question: Which house represents the father in horary? Look closely at the moon (co-significator of You), first (You), fourth and tenth house rulers. This will give you an answer that will work for you.

Interpretation
Fundamental to horary astrology is the concept of planetary dignity and reception. Strength is found in two forms, essential and accidental. Essential refers to the quality of a planet at a particular degree of the zodiac and its ability to express its inherent nature. Accidental fortitudes refer to the circumstances in which the planet "finds itself". That is, if the planet is in a traditionally bad house (6th, 8th, or 12th) in the chart, if it is retrograde, aspected by malefic planet (Saturn or Mars), combust, etc., then it is considered an accidental debility and circumstantially hindered.

Reception refers to how each planet in a horary question chart "view" or "receive'" each other, either favourably, unfavourably, or somewhere in between. If Mars is in Taurus, and Venus is in Scorpio, then each of the planets is in the sign the other planet rules. (Venus is ruler of Taurus, Mars of Scorpio.) This is called mutual reception by rulership, and although each planet is in its detriment, it nevertheless receives the other planet favourably. In some horary questions, a thorough understanding of receptions (and the above example skims the surface of this topic) is required to delineate the interplay of how the various significators view each other what sort of attitudes are taking place in the area of the question.

See also 
Electional astrology
Katarche – ancient horary

References

 William Lilly (1602-1681) Christian Astrology, An Introduction to Astrology, 1647, Astrology Classics 2004
 Marc Edmund Jones: Problem Solving by Horary Astrology, David Mc Kay, 1946
 Derek Appleby: Horary Astrology R. Reginald/Borgo Press, 1986 

Astrology by type